Matthew "Matt" Perrella (born October 6, 1991) is an American soccer player who plays as a goalkeeper for the Milwaukee Wave in the Major Arena Soccer League.

Career 
After playing four years of collegiate soccer at Division I Rider University, Perrella went on to get his Master's from Durham University in England. While playing for non-league side Durham City A.F.C., he was scouted by Newcastle United F.C. when Durham played the Newcastle United Reserves and won 2–0 with Perrella keeping a clean sheet in an outstanding performance. This led to trials with Newcastle United F.C. in England, Udinese Calcio in Italy, LB Châteauroux in France, FK Daugava Rīga in Latvia and APOEL FC in Cyprus. In the United States, Perrella spent time with the Carolina Railhawks (now North Carolina FC) and Sporting Kansas City. Perrella's European tour came to an end when he was denied of dual citizenship (US/France) and returned to the US.

In 2013, Perrella signed with Jacksonville Armada FC at the start of the clubs franchise. After making zero appearances in four months, Perrella left for Sporting Kansas City.

In 2016, Perrella signed with Bethlehem Steel FC. Perrella also had previous stints with Carolina Railhawks of the NASL and New Jersey Copa SC of the NPSL On May 1, 2017, Steel FC announced that they and Perrella had mutually parted ways, with Perrella not making an appearance during the 2017 season.

On May 14, 2017, Perella signed with Jacksonville Armada FC on a one match loan to provide goalkeeping cover.

On August 10, 2017, Perella signed with Pittsburgh Riverhounds of the USL on a contract for the remainder of the season. He was intended as a replacement for Keasel Broome, who had to undergo season-ending wrist surgery. Perrella's contract expired at the end of the season and was not renewed by the Riverhounds. He made eight appearances during his short spell with the club.

In 2018 Perella played with NPSL side Atlantic City FC and was the Keystone Conference goalkeeper of the year.

Perella joined the Drexel Dragons women's team coaching staff on April 12, 2019. He also joined the staff of USL League Two's Ocean City Nor'easters in the summer of 2019.

Perella was signed by Utica City FC of the MASL on May 30, 2019.

After appearing in just one game for Utica in the 2019–20 season, Perrella signed with the Rochester Lancers in October 2020. Now he coaches a local soccer team in Washington Township team.

References

External links 
 

1991 births
Living people
American soccer players
North Carolina FC players
Philadelphia Union II players
Pittsburgh Riverhounds SC players
People from North Brunswick, New Jersey
Soccer players from New Jersey
Sportspeople from Middlesex County, New Jersey
USL Championship players
Association football goalkeepers
Syracuse Silver Knights players
Major Arena Soccer League players
Harrisburg Heat (MASL) players
Utica City FC players
American soccer coaches
USL League Two coaches
Drexel Dragons women's soccer coaches
Alumni of Durham University
Durham City A.F.C. players
American expatriate soccer players
Expatriate footballers in England
American expatriate sportspeople in England
Jacksonville Armada FC players
National Premier Soccer League players
Rochester Lancers (1967–1980) players
Atlantic City FC players
Rider Broncs men's soccer players
Indoor soccer goalkeepers